Luigi "Gigi" Datome (born 27 November 1987) is an Italian professional basketball player for Olimpia Milano of the Lega Basket Serie A (LBA) and the EuroLeague. Datome was an All-EuroLeague Second Team selection in 2016.

Professional career

Early years
Born in Montebelluna to Sardinian parents from Olbia, Datome moved to Olbia in Sardinia, where he started playing junior basketball. He joined Montepaschi Siena of the first division Serie A in 2003. He played three and a half seasons for Montepaschi before joining Scafati Basket in February 2007.

Virtus Roma (2008–2013)
In 2008, Datome signed with Virtus Roma where he went on to earn the league's Best Under 22 player award for the 2008–09 season. In 2012–13, he was named the Lega Basket Serie A MVP, after averaging 16.4 points and 5.6 rebounds per game.

Detroit Pistons (2013–2015)
On 16 July 2013, Datome signed a two-year, $3.5 million contract with the Detroit Pistons. On 23 December 2013, he scored a season-high 13 points in a 115–92 win over the Cleveland Cavaliers.

On 14 January 2015, Datome was assigned by the Pistons to the Grand Rapids Drive of the NBA Development League. On 20 January, he was recalled by the Pistons.

Boston Celtics (2015)
On 19 February 2015, Datome was traded, along with Jonas Jerebko, to the Boston Celtics, in exchange for Tayshaun Prince. On 15 April, in the Celtics' final regular season game, he earned his first career NBA start; Datome responded with a career- and game-high 22 points, leading Boston to a narrow victory over the Milwaukee Bucks.

Fenerbahçe (2015–2020)
On 14 July 2015, Datome signed a two-year contract with the Turkish club Fenerbahçe. In his first season with the team, Datome won the Turkish Cup with a 67–65 win over Darüşşafaka. Fenerbahçe also reached the final game of the 2016 Euroleague Final Four, but fell short of winning the EuroLeague championship, after an overtime 96–101 loss to CSKA Moscow. Over 29 EuroLeague games, he averaged 12.4 points and 4.4 rebounds per game. At the end of the season, Fenerbahçe also won the Turkish League championship.

On 5 July 2017, Datome signed a three-year contract extension with Fenerbahçe. In 2017–18 EuroLeague, Fenerbahçe made it to the 2018 EuroLeague Final Four, its fourth consecutive Final Four appearance. Eventually, they lost to Real Madrid with 80–85 in the final game. Over 35 EuroLeague games, he averaged 9.6 points, 3.4 rebounds and 1.1 assists per game.

On 2 July 2019, Datome signed another contract extension with the Turkish club through the 2021-22 season. On 30 June 2020, Datome and the Turkish club parted ways after five quite successful seasons.

Olimpia Milano (2020–present)
On 30 June 2020, Datome signed with Olimpia Milano of the Lega Basket Serie A (LBA).

Career statistics

NBA

Regular season

|-
| align="left" | 
| align="left" | Detroit
| 34 || 0 || 7.0 || .351 || .179 || .800 || 1.4 || .3 || .2 || .0 || 2.4
|-
| align="left" | 
| align="left" | Detroit
| 3 || 0 || 5.7 || .417 || .250 || .000 || 1.3 || .7 || .3 || .0 || 3.7
|-
| align="left" | 
| align="left" | Boston
| 18 || 1 || 10.7 || .494 || .472 || 1.000 || 1.4 || .4 || .1 || .4 || 5.2
|- class="sortbottom"
| align="center" colspan="2"| Career
| 55 || 1 || 8.1 || .414 || .361 || .818 || 1.4 || .4 || .1 || .1 || 3.4

Playoffs

|-
| align="left" | 2015
| align="left" | Boston
| 3 || 0 || 4.7 || .333 || .000 || .000 || .3 || .3 || .0 || .0 || 1.3
|-
| align="center" colspan="2"| Career
| 3 || 0 || 4.7 || .333 || .000 || .000 || .3 || .3 || .0 || .0 || 1.3

EuroLeague

|-
| align="left" | 2004–05
| align="left" rowspan=2| Montepaschi
| 6 || 0 || 5.5 || .583 || .000 || .000 || 1.3 || .2 || .3 || .0 || 2.3 || 2.5
|-
| align="left" | 2005–06
| 11 || 2 || 11.2 || .538 || .579 || 1.000 || 2.3 || .4 || .7 || .2 || 5.2 || 5.1
|-
| align="left" | 2008–09
| align="left" rowspan=3| Virtus Roma
| 13 || 2 || 16.9 || .417 || .348 || .895 || 3.7 || .6 || .4 || .3 || 5.8 || 5.8
|-
| align="left" | 2009–10
| 2 || 0 || 10.9 || .400 || .400 || 1.000 || 2.0 || .5 || .0 || .0 || 6.0 || 4.5
|-
| align="left" | 2010–11
| 13 || 12 || 24.5 || .438 || .367 || 1.000 || 4.3 || .7 || 1.1 || .4 || 9.1 || 7.5
|-
| style="text-align:left;"| 2015–16
| style="text-align:left;" rowspan=5| Fenerbahçe
| 29 || 23 || 27.0 || .516 || .462 || .867 || 4.4 || 1.9 || .4 || .3 || 12.4 || 13.3
|-
| style="text-align:left;background:#AFE6BA;"| 2016–17†
| 33 || 21 || 23.6 || .442 || .466 || .944 || 3.7 || 1.1 || .5 || .1 || 9.2 || 8.8
|-
| style="text-align:left;"| 2017–18
| 35 || 15 || 23.9 || .486 || .444 || .917 || 3.4 || 1.1 || .4 || .6 || 9.6 || 9.7
|-
| style="text-align:left;"| 2018–19
| 34 || 15 || 21.0 || .477 || .415 || .917 || 3.6 || .8 || .5 || .2 || 9.0 || 8.4
|-
| style="text-align:left;"| 2019–20
| 28 || 15 || 22.4 || .478 || .431 || .929 || 3.4 || 1.3 || .8 || .3 || 8.3 || 7.4
|- class="sortbottom"
| align="center" colspan="2"| Career
| 204 || 105 || 21.9 || .476 || .435 || .912 || 3.6 || 1.0 || .5 || .3 || 8.9 || 8.6

National team

National team career
Datome played with the senior men's Italian national team at the 2007 EuroBasket, the EuroBasket 2011, and the 2013 EuroBasket. He was also a part of the Italian squad that would take part in the 2015 EuroBasket. However, after injuring a muscle during Italy's second game of the tournament, against Iceland, Datome had to pull out of the rest of the tournament.

Datome also represented Italy at the 2016 Turin FIBA World Olympic Qualifying Tournament, and at the 2017 EuroBasket

See also
 List of youngest EuroLeague players

References

External links

Luigi Datome at draftexpress.com
Luigi Datome at eurobasket.com
Luigi Datome at euroleague.net
Luigi Datome at fibaeurope.com
Luigi Datome at legabasket.it 
Luigi Datome at tblstat.net

1987 births
Living people
2019 FIBA Basketball World Cup players
Boston Celtics players
Detroit Pistons players
Fenerbahçe men's basketball players
Olimpia Milano players
Grand Rapids Drive players
Italian men's basketball players
Italian expatriate basketball people in Turkey
Italian expatriate basketball people in the United States
Italian people of Sardinian descent
Lega Basket Serie A players
Mens Sana Basket players
National Basketball Association players from Italy
Pallacanestro Virtus Roma players
People from Montebelluna
Power forwards (basketball)
Scafati Basket players
Small forwards
Undrafted National Basketball Association players
Sportspeople from the Province of Treviso